Paul-Arnold Garita, or just Arnold Garita,  (born 18 June 1995) is a Cameroonian professional footballer who plays for Romanian Liga I club FC Argeș Pitești.

Club career

Châteauroux
Born in Douala, Cameroon, Garita moved to France and started playing football at 13, leading him to join CO Vincennes. When he was 15, he left CO Vincennes to join Châteauroux, where he started his youth career. He progressed through the ranks of the Châteauroux academy despite the difficulties. By 2012, he was linked with away from the club, as he was on a basic youth contract, leading interests from Arsenal, Newcastle United, RCD Espanyol and VfL Wolfsburg.

He made his professional debut for LB Châteauroux, where he came on as a late substitute for Clément Tainmont, and scored an equaliser, in a 1–1 draw against AJ Auxerre on 30 November 2012. Having appeared two more times as a substitute later in the season, Garita signed his first professional contract with the club in February 2013. At the end of the 2012–13 season, he went on to make four appearances and scoring once in all competitions.

In the 2013–14 season, Garita spent the start of the season on the sidelines and didn't make his first appearance of the season, coming on as a late substitute, in a 2–2 draw against Stade Lavallois on 13 December 2013. Seven days later, on 20 December 2013, he scored twice, after coming on as a substitute in fourteen minutes from the game, in a 3–1 win over Dijon FCO. He scored against Dijon again this season on 6 May 2014, which saw Châteauroux lose 2–1. At the end of the 2013–14 season, Garita went on to make eight times and scoring three times in all competitions.

However, at the start of the 2014–15 season, he suffered an ankle injury that saw him on the sidelines. On 16 November 2014, he made his return from the sidelines against Meymac CA in the seventh round of Coupe de France and scored twice, in a 6–0 win. In a follow up match against Auxerre five days later, he scored again, in a 3–1 loss. He later spent the rest of the 2014–15 season, appearing in a number of matches, as he went on to make fourteen appearances and scoring twice in all competitions.

In the 2015–16 season, with the club relegated to Championnat National, Garita remained in the first team despite facing limited time of football. He went on to make six appearances and scoring two times in all competitions.

Bristol City
Garita joined Bristol City on 7 January 2016, from French club Châteauroux for a fee of £50,000. He went on a trial last November and lasted for two weeks, which he impressed the side.

During his time at Bristol City, Garita fight for his place in the first team, but was demoted to the club's U23 side instead. This also included injury concerns. He did appear in the first team as an unused substitute in a quarter–final of Football League Cup, in a 2–1 win over Manchester United.

He was released by Bristol City at the end of the 2017–18 season, without making a single appearance for the side.

Plymouth Argyle (loan)
On 31 August 2016, the last day of the 2016 summer transfer window, Garita signed on loan for Plymouth Argyle initially for half of the 2016–17 season.

He made his Plymouth Argyle debut, where he came on as a substitute for Jake Jervis, in a 1–0 win over Cheltenham Town on 3 September 2016. Two weeks later, on 17 September 2016, he scored his first goal for the club, as well as, setting up a goal, in a 2–0 win over Exeter City. However, he suffered a hamstring injury shortly after and was sidelined for two months.

After spending two months on the sidelines, Garita made his return on 19 November 2016, where he started the match, in a 3–0 loss against Grimsby Town. Following his return from injury, he appeared in a number of matches, playing in the attacker role. Two months later, on 14 January 2017, he scored his second goal for the club, in a 4–2 win over Stevenage. Shortly after, his loan spell at Plymouth Argyle was extended until the end of the season.

However, by the end of January, Garita suffered another injury that kept him out for two months. On 8 April 2017, he made his return from injury, coming on as a substitute, in a 2–1 win over Crawley Town. At the end of the 2016–17 season, which saw Plymouth Argyle promoted to League One next season, Garita went on to make 18 appearances and scoring two times in all competitions. For his performance, he was awarded the club's Young Player of the Year.

Charleroi
On 31 August 2018, the last day of the 2018 summer transfer window, Garita joined Belgian First Division A side Charleroi and was immediately loaned out to Championnat National side USL Dunkerque.

In June 2019 it was announced, that Garita had been loaned out again, this time to US Boulogne for the 2019–20 season. A third season of loans to Championnat National sides, followed for the 2020–21 season, with Garita joining FC Villefranche in late June 2020.

FBBB01
On 1 July 2021, he signed with FBBP01, again in the Championnat National, on a permanent basis.

Argeș Pitești
On 12 July 2022, Garita signed a two-year contract with Argeș Pitești in Romania.

Career statistics

Club

References

External links
 

1995 births
Living people
Footballers from Douala
Cameroonian emigrants to France
Association football forwards
Cameroonian footballers
Cameroonian expatriate footballers
Cameroonian expatriate sportspeople in France
Expatriate footballers in France
Cameroonian expatriate sportspeople in England
Expatriate footballers in England
Cameroonian expatriate sportspeople in Belgium
Expatriate footballers in Belgium
Cameroonian expatriate sportspeople in Romania
Expatriate footballers in Romania
LB Châteauroux players
Bristol City F.C. players
Plymouth Argyle F.C. players
USL Dunkerque players
US Boulogne players
FC Villefranche Beaujolais players
Football Bourg-en-Bresse Péronnas 01 players
FC Argeș Pitești players
English Football League players
Ligue 2 players
Championnat National players
Championnat National 3 players
Liga I players